Ivana Ivaštanin (born 7 August 1996) is a Montenegrin footballer who plays as a defender. She has been a member of the Montenegro women's national team.

References

1996 births
Living people
Women's association football defenders
Montenegrin women's footballers
Montenegro women's international footballers
ŽFK Ekonomist players